The J. M. Chapman House in Montclair, Essex County, New Jersey, United States was built in 1907.  It was designed by architect A.F. Norris.  It has also been known as Perez House.  It was listed on the National Register of Historic Places in 1988.

The house was featured in American Homes & Gardens January 1906 edition.

The home was designed after a cover of the magazine published a rendering of a stately English country home. People wrote the magazine asking for the floor plans, but none existed.  Mr. J. M. Chapman commissioned A.F. Norris, Architect.  Completed in 1907, it was featured in the June 1908 edition of American Homes and Gardens.

References

Houses on the National Register of Historic Places in New Jersey
Tudor Revival architecture in New Jersey
Houses completed in 1907
Montclair, New Jersey
Houses in Essex County, New Jersey
National Register of Historic Places in Essex County, New Jersey